L'Epée is a Swiss luxury brand, specialized in manufacturing mechanical clocks. Its factory is in Delémont, in the Canton du Jura.

History

1839 – Creation 
At the age of 41, Auguste L’Epée (1798–1875) joined forces with Pierre-Henri Paur from Geneva to found the L’Epée Manufacture in Saint Suzanne in the Doubs department of France. At the time, the Manufacture produced horological products and music boxes.

1850 – The escapement 
Keen to enrich its savoir-faire, the L’Epée Manufacture started producing platform escapements for prestigious alarm clocks and carriage clocks from 1850. This was a key turning point in the company's development.

1857 – Expertise and patents 
Just seven years after launching this new line of business, L’Epée submitted its first patents to the authorities to establish and protect its expertise. The Manufacture won recognition throughout the clock making world for its high-quality platform escapements, several of which presented highly specific systems that were very useful at the time, placing the company at the forefront of the horological scene. Some of these patents, such as those protecting the "anti-knocking" system, the "auto-starting" mechanism, and the constant-force escapement, made a lasting impression on their era.

1877–1889 – Record-breaking annual production 
The Manufacture's reputation defined it as both the leader and a reference in escapements. The company's annual production of platform escapements gradually increased over two decades, culminating at 200,000 platform escapements in 1889—nothing short of exceptional for the time!

1889–1902 – Gold medals 
This growing success was rewarded with various gold medals at the World Fairs held in Paris in 1889 and 1900, in Vienna in 1892, in Hanoi in 1902, and in America and the United Kingdom.

Early 20th century – Diversification 
During these first few decades, the L’Epée Manufacture decided to diversify by producing other mechanical movements for both clockmaking (precision instruments, for example) and associated industries.  1975 – Luxury watchmaking 1975 marked a major turning point for the Manufacture. New company directors reoriented production to focus on the design and creation of luxury clocks and carriage clocks.   1976 – Aeronautics in 1976, the Manufacture participated in a major aeronautical project, the Concorde, by fitting the first commercial flights of this supersonic airplane with wall clocks.

1994 – The Giant Regulator 
L'Epée unveiled the largest clock in the world at that time, known as "the Giant Regulator", earning it a place in the Guinness Book of Records. This one-off creation measures 2.20 m tall and weighs 1.2 tons. Its mechanical movement alone weighs 120 kg. This modern-day masterpiece required more than 2,800 hours of work and was unveiled at the Louvre in Paris, before touring Europe, the Middle East and the US.

2008 – Acquisition of the Manufacture by Swiza SA 
Swiza SA, which already owned Swiza 1904 and Matthew Norman, bought the L’Epée brand. L’Epée and Swiza thus combined their expertise to form the only Swiss Manufacture specializing in quartz clocks and high-end mechanics.

2009 – The creation of a new modern collection 
L’Epée 1839 developed a collection of desk clocks, including a range of classic carriage clocks, contemporary models (Le Duel) and minimalist models (La Tour). The L’Epée creations feature complications such as retrograde seconds, power-reserve indicators in the form of animated logos, perpetual calendars, tourbillons, chiming mechanisms and more, all designed and produced in-house.

2014 
L’Epée 1839 unveils the Starfleet Machine and the Two Hands to mark its 175th anniversary, followed by the Melchior robot created in partnership with MB&F in 2015.

The collection 
Creative Art :
This collection is created with the horological lab MB&F: 
 Sherman :  A mechanical Robot that gives time, inspired by the US tank 
 Arachnophobia : Gives time with two hands and eight legs 
 Melchior : celebration of the 10th anniversary of MB&F 
 Starfleet Machine : A design inspired by Star- Trek

Contemporary Timepiece :
 Two Hands : Unique piece created with Vincent Calabrese with a Tourbillon 
 Duet : Created with Reuge, the music box manufacture
 Le Duel : 40-day movement based on the animation of L’Epée's logo
 Le Duel Perpetuel Tourbillon : includes a Tourbillon, a in-line perpetual calendar, a double retrograde seconds and power reserve indicators
 Le Duel Perpetuel
 La Tour et La Tour Noire : Inspired by the Bauhaus art movement

Carriage Clocks :
Traditional clock, also known as Pendule d’officier in French
 Anglaise
 Corniche
 Ovale
 Ovale Tourbillon
 Ovale Géante

References 
Robb Report
A Blog to Watch
Hodinkee
The Watches TV

External links
L'Epée website
Matthew Norman website
Swiza website

Clock brands